NGC 612 is a lenticular galaxy in the constellation of Sculptor located approximately 388 million light-years from Earth. It is a type II Seyfert galaxy and thus has an active galactic nucleus. NGC 612 has been identified as an extremely rare example of a non-elliptical radio galaxy, hosting one of the nearest powerful FR-II radio sources.

Observation history 
The object was discovered by British astronomer John Herschel on 29 November, 1837. John Louis Emil Dreyer, compiler of the first New General Catalogue of Nebulae and Clusters of Stars, described NGC 612 as a "faint, very small, round, 12th magnitude star to the west."

Physical characteristics 
NGC 612 has a fairly well-developed luminous disc seen almost edge-on and features a strong dust ring. The galaxy is surrounded by an enormous disc of cool neutral hydrogen gas with a mass of  M☉ distributed in a 140 kpc wide structure along the galactic disc and dust lane of NGC 612. The majority of the gas is relatively settled in regular rotation with a velocity of 8900 km/s. A faint bridge, spanning 400 kpc, exists between NGC 612 and the gas-rich barred spiral galaxy NGC 619, indicating that an interaction between both galaxies occurred at some point. Current or past interaction, such as a merger event, is currently the most likely trigger of NGC 612's radio source.

The galaxy has an unusually young star population, with populations throughout the galactic disc having an age of ~0.04 - 0.1 Gyr.

See also 
 NGC 4151 - another example of a non-elliptical radio galaxy
 List of galaxies

References 

Astronomical objects discovered in 1837
Discoveries by John Herschel
Lenticular galaxies
612
Sculptor (constellation)
005827